Seyyed Mohammad Motamedi Qamsari, known as Mohammad Motamedi (born on September 24, 1978) is an Iranian traditional vocalist, and a ney player.

He has started learning singing & also playing ney as self-taught since adolescence. He has studied "Film Directing" as his major in University. However, he has been singing and training since adolescence by listening to the works of maestros of Persian singing. Since 1997, he started learning singing style of Seyed Hossein Taherzadeh. Due to his interest in Esfahan school of singing, he learned this school of singing by practicing the songs of its maestros such as Taj Esfahani & Adib Khansari and has benefitted from guidance of esteemed masters such as the late Dr. Hossein Omoumi & Aliasghar Shahzeidi" in this regard.

He has a very vast resume ranging from working with the great Maestros of Iranian music such as Alexander Rahbari, Mohammadreza Lotfi, Hossein Alizadeh, Majid Derakhshani, Farhad Fakhreddini, etc. as well as working with international figures and many performances in prestigious venues such as Carnegie Hall, Theatre de la ville, Muziekgebouw Amsterdam, etc. Recently, he collaborated with Roger Waters in an album by Trio Jobran called "The Long March".

He has been able to create his own dialect and original style of singing and therefore, currently he is regarded as the most characterful singer while being among the few best traditional singers.

Radio France prize winner – 2013 

Ocora is a French record label specializing in field recordings of world music and each year release an album by the winner of the France Musique world music prize. The 2013 winner was the Iranian singer Mohammad Motamedi. A perfect exponent of Persian classical singing from Iran's younger generation, Motamedi finds his inspiration in his love of classic Persian poetry. Accompanied by kamancheh fiddle, tar lute, ney flute and the daf and tombak drums, the singing of Motamedi takes this subtle ancient tradition to new heights. The recordings of the album (Mohammad Motamedi & Chant classique) were made in Tehran in November–December 2013

Discography

 Boodan Va Soroudan (Majid Derakhshani & Khorshid Ensembl (Sun Ensembl)-2006
 Sufi (Mohammad Motamedi, Sina Jahanabadi & Hossein Rezaeinia)-2007 
 Ashoora Opera(Behzad Abdi & Behrouz Gharibpour )-2008 
 Vatanam Iran (Mohammad Reza Lotfi & Hamnavazan-e Sheida (Sheyda Ensembl)-2008 
 Video Album of Dashti Concert– Vatanam Iran (Mohammad Reza Lotfi & Sheida Threefold Groups)-2008 
 In Memory Of Aref Ghazvini (Aref Ghazvini & Mohammad Reza Lotfi)-2009 
 Ey Asheghan (Mohammad Reza Lotfi & Banovan-e Sheida (Sheida Women's Ensemble)-2009 
 Rumi Opera (Behzad Abdi & Behrouz Gharibpour)-2009 
 Video Album of Chavosh Concert – Iran Ey Saraye Omid (Mohammad Reza Lotfi & Hamnavazan-e Sheida (Sheyda Ensembl) -2009 
 Saye- e Jan (Mohammad Reza Lotfi & Sheyda Ensembl)-2010 
 So Long Goodbye (Ali Ghamsari)-2010 
 Gahi Segahi (Pouya Saraei )-2011 
 Overwhelmed By Mist (Arash kamvar )-2012 
 Mohammad Motamedi & Chant Classique (Radio France)-2013 
 Badeh Toei (Hossein Alizadeh & Hamavayan Ensemble)-2014 
 In The Distance a Call (Mehdi Teimoori )-2015 
 Pass (Ali Gamsari )-2015 
 Eshghim Gal (Azari )-(Hossein Alizadeh & Hamavayan Ensemble)-2015
Dauntless (with Ebrahim Tehranipour)-2017
The Long March (with Trio Jobran and Roger Waters)-2018
Told me where you are (Majid wafadar) 2018
Sarmast (Majid Khalaj) 2018
Wait  (Mahyar Alizadeh) 2020

Significant works 
Rumi Opera (Behzad Abdi & Behrouz Gharibpour-2009)
Mohammad Motamedi & Chant Classique-2014
The Long March (with Trio Jobran and Roger Waters)-2018

Awards 
Radio France prize winner-2013

Rumi Award- 2018

Concerts

Extemporization concert in theatre of Paris
Concert in historical Palace of Versailles
Concert at The Festival Of China-Shanghai-2005
Concert in Rasa theatre – Otrowkht, Trophen Theatre – Amsterdam (Poland)
Concert in Music Conservator Rome-Italy
Participation in International Festival of Sufi Music in Karachi – Pakistan
Participation in International Festival of Magham in Azerbaijan
Concert in Headquarters of UNESCO paris – Paris
Participation in Morgan Land Festival – Osnabruck – Germany
Qasida Concert: Rosario La Tremendita & Mohammad Motamedi – Iran & Flamenco
Rumi Ensemble & Mohammad Motamedi European Tour 2013
Concert with Raz Music Ensemble (Honor of Jalāl ad-Dīn Muhammad Rūmī) at Konya, Turkey December 2015
Qasida Concert: Rosario La Tremendita & Mohammad Motamedi at BOZAR – Brussels March 2016
Qasida Concert: Rosario La Tremendita & Mohammad Motamedi at Cleveland Museum of Arts, Cleveland OH March 2016
Qasida Concert: Rosario La Tremendita & Mohammad Motamedi at Zankel Hall – Carnegie Hall, New York March 2016
Qasida Concert: Rosario La Tremendita & Mohammad Motamedi at Lisner Auditorium, Washington DC March 2016
Qasida Concert: Rosario La Tremendita & Mohammad Motamedi at Berklee Performance Center, Boston MA March 2016
Concert at Garonne Theater, Toulouse France April 2016
Concert at Odeon Theater, Nîmes France April 2016

See also
List of Iranian musicians
Music of Iran
National Iranian Symphony Orchestra
Persian Symphonic Music
Hossein Alizadeh
Kayhan Kalhor
Mohammad Reza Lotfi
Shahram Nazeri
Mohammad-Reza Shajarian

References

External links
 
 

1978 births
Living people
Singers from Tehran
21st-century Iranian male singers
Festival directors